On February 27, 1969, Republican James F. Battin resigned from the House to become judge of the U.S. District Court of Montana.

On June 24, 1969, Democrat John Melcher was elected to finish the term.  He remained in office until 1977.

See also 
 Montana's 2nd congressional district
 1969 United States House of Representatives elections

Montana 1969 02
Montana 1969 02
1969 02 Special
Montana 02 Special
United States House of Representatives 02 Special
United States House of Representatives 1969 02